United League may refer to one of the following sports leagues:

United League Baseball, an independent baseball league, founded in 2006, which operates in Texas
United Baseball League (proposed), a planned third major league that folded without playing a game in 1996
United League (football), a short-lived professional association football league in England which existed during the late 19th century
United League (social organization)
VTB United League, a basketball league
United League, one of the English names for the revolutionary group Tongmenghui